H. Muhammad Amin (5 July 1960 – 6 August 2021) was an Indonesian politician.

Biography
He served as the Vice Governor of West Nusa Tenggara from 2013 to 2018. He ran for re-election in the 2018 elections, but was defeated by Zulkieflimansyah.

Amin died from complications of COVID-19 during the COVID-19 pandemic in Indonesia.

References

1960 births
2021 deaths
Deaths from the COVID-19 pandemic in Indonesia
People from West Nusa Tenggara
Democratic Party (Indonesia) politicians
Crescent Star Party (Indonesia) politicians
Golkar politicians